Pact for San Marino was a centrist coalition of parties for the 2008 general election in San Marino.

It was composed of four lists for a total of eight parties:

Election results and summary
The electoral coalition won 35 seats out of 60 in the Grand and General Council in the Sammarinese parliamentary election, 2008 gaining 54.22% of the national vote and an automatic governmental majority of 5 and became the new government of San Marino with Ernesto Benedettini of the Sammarinese Christian Democratic Party and Assunta Meloni of Popular Alliance becoming Captains Regent of San Marino, defeating the left-wing Reforms and Freedom coalition which gained 25 seats in the Grand and General council and failed to get a governing majority. Pact for San Marino replaced the previous left-wing governing coalition of Party of Socialists and Democrats, United Left and Popular Alliance.

The alliance collapsed in 2011, with San Marino returning to the old governing alliance between Christian Democrats, Socialists and Liberals.

Defunct political party alliances in San Marino